The Sweet Ride is a 1968 American drama film with a few surfer/biker exploitation film elements. It stars Tony Franciosa, Michael Sarrazin and Jacqueline Bisset in an early starring role. The film also features Bob Denver in the role of Choo-Choo, a Beatnik piano-playing draft dodger. Sarrazin and Bisset were nominated for the Golden Globe Award for Most Promising Newcomer, Male and Female respectively.

The Sweet Ride was directed by Harvey Hart and written by Tom Mankiewicz, based on a 1967 novel of the same name by William Murray, a native of New York City, who had moved to southern California in 1966.

Plot
The story, told in flashbacks, concerns a middle-aged tennis bum (Franciosa) who shares a beach house with Sarrazin and Denver. Their carefree life becomes complicated, and later turns tragic, after they become involved with a mysterious young woman (Bisset) and a biker gang.

The San Francisco rock and roll band Moby Grape contributed to the soundtrack, and appeared, credited, in the film, performing the song "Never Again" in a Sunset Strip nightclub called the Tarantula. Other famous Sunset Strip locations include Gazzarri's and Scandia, as well as location filming in Malibu, according to reviews of the film.

Dusty Springfield sings "Sweet Ride" over the film's opening credits.

Cast
 Tony Franciosa as Collie Ransom
 Michael Sarrazin as Denny McGuire
 Jacqueline Bisset as Vickie Cartwright
 Bob Denver as Choo-Choo Burns
 Michael Wilding as Mr. Cartwright
 Michele Carey as Thumper Stevens
 Lara Lindsay as Martha
 Norma Crane as Mrs. Cartwright
 Percy Rodriguez as Lieutenant Harvey Atkins
 Warren Stevens as Brady Caswell
 Pat Buttram as Texan
 Michael Forest as Barry Green
 Lloyd Gough as Parker
 Stacy King as Big Jane
 Corinna Tsopei as Tennis Girl
 Charles Dierkop as Mr. Clean
 Arthur Franz as Psychiatrist
 Paul Condylis as Sergeant Soloman (uncredited)
 Lou Procopio as Diablo (uncredited)
 Ralph Lee as Scratch (uncredited)

Production
Jacqueline Bisset was cast on the basis of her short appearance in Two for the Road starring Audrey Hepburn and Albert Finney. By the time The Sweet Ride was released she had been cast in The Detective starring Frank Sinatra and Bullitt starring Steve McQueen.

Tom Mankiewicz, who wrote the screenplay, later said the problem with the film was "it tried to touch all the bases at once: drama, comedy, porn, dropouts, surfing, true love, a touch of perversion, and the general malaise of 1960s young people.  Frankie and Annette it definitely wasn't."

Mankiewicz also says producer Joe Pasternak had suffered a stroke shortly before filming which impacted his effectiveness.

Box Office
According to Fox records the film required $3,950,000 in rentals to break even and by 11 December 1970 had made $2,600,000 so made a loss.

Musical score and soundtrack

The score was composed, arranged and conducted by Pete Rugolo except the main title written by Lee Hazlewood and  performed by Dusty Springfield with the soundtrack album released on the 20th Century Fox label.

Reception

The Allmusic review by Tony Wilds noted: "Rugolo hits many of the same areas that made several Lalo Schifrin soundtracks great, but unlike Schifrin, Rugolo lacks the killer pop instinct. It all sounds like soundtrack music (the average cut is only about two minutes long), and there's nothing here that hadn't been done better elsewhere, earlier.".

Track listing
All compositions by Pete Rugolo except where noted.
 "Sweet Ride (Main Title)" (Lee Hazlewood) - - 2:02
 "Vicky Meets Danny"- 2:30
 "Collier's Riff" - 1:35
 "Come Bossa With Me" - 1:53
 "Thumper" - 1:20
 "My Name Is Mr. Clean" - 2:09
 "Lost Wages Brash" - 1:50
 "Turn Me On" - 3:08
 "Sock Me Choo Choo (Sweet Ride Theme)" (Lee Hazlewood) - 1:50
 "Bedroom Time" - 3:08
 "Where's The Melody" - 1:00
 "Swing Me Lightly" - 2:31

Personnel
Pete Rugolo - arranger, conductor
Dusty Springfield - vocals (track 1)
Unidentified Orchestra

References

External links
 
 
 
 The Video Beat!
 Cinema Sirens
 

1968 drama films
1968 films
20th Century Fox films
American drama films
Films based on American novels
Films directed by Harvey Hart
Films produced by Joe Pasternak
Films set in Malibu, California
Films set on beaches
Outlaw biker films
Films with screenplays by Tom Mankiewicz
American surfing films
Beach party films
1960s English-language films
1960s American films